is a Japanese actress, gravure idol, and tarento from Tokyo. Her most notable appearances are in two Kamen Rider series, namely Kamen Rider Agito and Kamen Rider Den-O. She also has a cameo appearance in Metal Gear Solid 3: Snake Eater in which she is featured in a poster on one of the levels. She has also been named to have the "Best Butt in Japan" in 2007, which earned her the nickname , a portmanteau of the words "oshiri" (butt) and "Rina".

Personal life 
On June 30, 2015, she married boat racer Shoshi Goto. On February 19, 2016, she gave birth to a first boy. On March 26, 2020, she gave birth to a second boy. On August 31, 2022, she gave birth to her third child.

Filmography

References

External links 
 KirinPro talent agency profile 
 Rina Akiyama official blog 
 Personal blog 

1985 births
Living people
21st-century Japanese actresses
21st-century Japanese singers
Actresses from Tokyo
Japanese film actresses
Japanese gravure models
Japanese television actresses
Japanese television personalities
Singers from Tokyo